Künstlerleben ("Artist's Life"), Op. 316 is a waltz written by Johann Strauss II in 1867, following closely on the success of the popular "The Blue Danube". Austria was severely shaken the previous year 1866 by the crushing defeat that the Austrian army suffered in the Battle of Königgrätz and many of the year's festivities and balls were cancelled as the prevalent depressing mood affected most of Vienna's populace.

Strauss's near impossible task of injecting the same joie de vivre into the Vienna Carnival of 1867 was met with great aplomb by all three Strauss brothers as their works displayed no signs of dying inspiration, and in turn introducing to the Viennese how their creative spirit defied the troubled spirit of the times.

Johann Strauss II and Josef Strauss both presented sparkling new works at the 'Hesperus' Ball which was held at the Dianabad-Saal on 18 February 1867, with the "Artist's Life" waltz presented just three nights after the successful performance of "The Blue Danube" at the same venue. The 'Hesperus' Association known as the Vienna Artists' Association was a well-known and influential society of which all three Strauss brothers were members.

The new waltz was quickly heralded as a new 'twin' of "The Blue Danube" and its popularity has since been retained in the classical music repertoire. The composer's best inspiration can be seen in the Introduction of the waltz, which begins with a plaintive horn solo and a quietly dramatic string passage in A minor. A pensive waltz melody in A major is introduced, before being cut short by two loud and fierce chords. The first waltz section is then played, with a high-spirited tune and a robust accompanying waltz passage. The second waltz section is a melancholic tune in two parts, with the same dramatic chords as heard in the Introduction before a more upbeat tune heralds the entry of the happier third section. The plaintive mood of the waltz continues in the fifth section before the minor-sounding Coda. The first waltz melody makes another quiet entrance before the waltz is brought to its triumphant close, with a strong chord and flourish, underlined by a snare-drumroll.

References

External links 
 

Waltzes by Johann Strauss II
1867 compositions